Milos Milos (born Miloš Milošević; 1 July 1941 – 30 January 1966) was a Serbian-born American actor, stunt double and bodyguard for actor Alain Delon.

Early life
Milos came from an influential family. His grandfather was the mayor of Knjaževac and his father was chairman of the Guild of Exporters of Yugoslavia. Milos's family suffered under the Communist authorities and most of their private properties were confiscated.

In the 1950s, Milošević and his friend Stevan Marković were involved in street fights in Belgrade. They met Alain Delon, who was filming Marco Polo, an eventually cancelled film, in Belgrade. Delon hired Milošević and Marković as bodyguards, and Milošević later moved to Hollywood, California.

Hollywood
As a young Hollywood actor, Milos is best known for his performance as a Soviet naval officer in the 1966 comedy The Russians Are Coming, the Russians Are Coming, as well as for his titular role in the 1966 Esperanto horror movie, Incubus.

Film roles

Personal life and death
Milos was married to Cynthia Bouron from 1964 to 1966; they had one child.

In 1965, Milos began an affair with actress Barbara Ann Thomason (stage name Carolyn Mitchell) who was estranged from her husband Mickey Rooney. Milos and Thomason were found dead in Rooney's Los Angeles house in 1966. The official inquiry found that Milos had shot Thomason with Rooney's chrome-plated .38 caliber revolver and then committed suicide. The official inquiry provoked rumors that they were actually both murdered in revenge for having an affair; however, Rooney was at St. John's Hospital in Santa Monica recovering from an infection that he caught on location in Manila during the filming of Ambush Bay.

References

External links
 
 Cara Jepson, "Curse of the 'Incubus'", Salon.com, 3 May 2000.

1941 births
1966 deaths
20th-century Serbian male actors
Murder–suicides in California
Male actors from Belgrade
People from Knjaževac
Serbian expatriates in the United States
Serbian male film actors
American stunt performers
Suicides by firearm in California
1966 suicides